Terra Tower is a  sandstone pillar located in Colorado National Monument, in Mesa County of western Colorado, United States. This 350-foot-high tower is situated on the Redlands escarpment, approximately seven miles west of the community of Grand Junction. The first ascent of the summit was made in 1979 by Harvey Carter and Tom Merrill via the  route, Way Bazaar.

Geology
This tower is the remnant of a differentially eroded fin composed primarily of cliff-forming Wingate Sandstone, which consists of wind-borne, cross-bedded quartzose sandstones deposited as ancient sand dunes approximately 200 million years ago in the Late Triassic. The caprock at the summit consists of fluvial sandstones of the resistant Kayenta Formation. The slope around the base of Terra Tower is Chinle Formation. Precipitation runoff from this geographical feature drains to the Colorado River, approximately two miles to the northeast.

Climate
According to the Köppen climate classification system, Terra Tower is located in a semi-arid climate zone. Summers are hot and dry, while winters are cold with some snow. Temperatures reach  on 5.3 days,  on 57 days, and remain at or below freezing on 13 days annually. The months April through October offer the most favorable weather to visit.

Climbing
Established rock climbing routes on Terra Tower:

 Way Bazaar –  First ascent 1979
 Tom Stubbs Memorial Route – class 5.11 – 4 pitches – FA 2012 – James Stover, Doug McKee

Gallery

See also
 List of rock formations in the United States

References

External links
 Terra Tower rock climbing: Mountainproject.com
 Terra Tower from golf course (photo): Flickr
 Weather forecast: National Weather Service

Colorado Plateau
Landforms of Mesa County, Colorado
Colorado National Monument
North American 1000 m summits
Sandstone formations of the United States
Rock formations of Colorado